The 1936–37 season was Mansfield Town's sixth season in the Football League and fifth in the Third Division North, they finished in 9th position with 44 points and were transferred to the Football League Third Division South. Notable this season was the goal scoring exploits of Ted Harston who scored 58 goals in 44 games including seven against Hartlepools United.

Final league table

Results

Football League Third Division North

FA Cup

Football League Third Division North Cup

Squad statistics
 Squad list sourced from

References
General
 Mansfield Town 1936–37 at soccerbase.com (use drop down list to select relevant season)

Specific

Mansfield Town F.C. seasons
Mansfield Town